In enzymology, a lipoyl(octanoyl) transferase is an enzyme that catalyzes the chemical reaction

octanoyl-[acyl-carrier-protein] + protein  protein N6-(octanoyl)lysine + acyl carrier protein

Thus, the two substrates of this enzyme are octanoyl-[acyl-carrier-protein] and protein, whereas its two products are protein N6-(octanoyl)lysine and acyl carrier protein.

This enzyme belongs to the family of transferases, specifically those acyltransferases transferring groups other than aminoacyl groups.  The systematic name of this enzyme class is octanoyl-[acyl-carrier-protein]:protein N-octanoyltransferase. Other names in common use include LipB, lipoyl (octanoyl)-[acyl-carrier-protein]-protein, N-lipoyltransferase, lipoyl (octanoyl)-acyl carrier protein:protein transferase, lipoate/octanoate transferase, lipoyltransferase, octanoyl-[acyl carrier protein]-protein N-octanoyltransferase, and lipoyl(octanoyl)transferase.  This enzyme participates in lipoic acid metabolism.

References

 
 
 
 
 
 

EC 2.3.1
Enzymes of unknown structure